David Court may refer to:

 David Court (footballer) (born 1944), English footballer and coach
 David Court (bishop) (born 1958), British Anglican bishop
 David Court (cricketer) (born 1980), English cricketer